Comet is an unincorporated community in Washington Township, Jackson County, Ohio, United States.

Comet was originally founded along the Ohio Southern Railroad as a company town for the Comet Coal Company, operating the Comet mine nearby.  As of 1895, there were 60 miners and 24 day-laborers employed at the mine.

References 

Unincorporated communities in Jackson County, Ohio